The Solar T62 Titan is an American gas turbine engine used mainly as a helicopter auxiliary power unit (APU), ground power generator, turboprop engine or helicopter turboshaft engine. A free power turbine version was developed as the Solar T66.

Variants
T62 TitanThe direct drive main production version.
T62T-2 at 56,700 turbine rpm for Boeing-Vertol CH-47A Chinook helicopters.
T62T-2A at 56,700 turbine rpm for Boeing-Vertol CH-47B / C Chinook helicopters.
T62T-11 at 56,700 turbine rpm for Boeing-Vertol CH-46A Sea Knight helicopters.
T62T-12 at 61,240 turbine rpm
T62T-16 / -16A1 for Sikorsky CH-3, Sikorsky SH-3 and Sikorsky CH-54A Skycrane helicopters at 56,700 turbine rpm, with 8,000 and 8,100 rpm outputs.
T62T-25Turboshaft -  at 56,700 turbine rpm
T62T-27Turboshaft -  at 61,250 turbine rpm, with 1x 8,000 and 1x 8,216 rpm outputs.
T62T-29Turboshaft -  at 56,700 turbine rpm, for Lockheed Jetstar and Pan American Falcon business Jets at 56,700 turbine rpm, with 1x 8,000 and 1x 8,100 rpm outputs.
T62T-32A at 61,250 rpm.  Military Ground Power Unit (GPU) often used by US Navy and Air Force.
T62T-39
T66A free power turbine version for the US military.

Applications
Auxiliary Power Unit
Boeing CH-46 Sea Knight
Boeing CH-47 Chinook
Sikorsky CH-54 Tarhe
Lockheed Jetstar
Pan American Falcon
EMU30/E 60 KW Gas Turbine Engine Driven Gen Set
 
Turboshaft
Alpi Syton AH 130
Auroa Helicopters Auroa
AvioTecnica ES-101 Raven
Eagle Helicycle
Famà Kiss 209
Gyrodyne RON Rotorcycle
Hillberg Turbine Exec
LAE Ultrasport 496T
Mosquito Aviation XE
RotorWay Exec 162F (upgrades)
Winner B150

Turboprop
 Bede BD-5

Specifications

Notes

External links
 Solar T62 Auxiliary Power Unit - Lesson 7 To enable you to describe the T62 APU, how it operates, and its various components

1950s turboshaft engines
Caterpillar Inc.
Aircraft auxiliary power units
Aircraft gas generator engines